Halidrys is a genus of brown algae belonging to the family Sargassaceae.

The species of this genus are found in Europe and Northern America.

Species:

Halidrys dioica 
Halidrys siliquosa

References

Fucales
Fucales genera